Rehima Zergaw is an Ethiopian international football player. Rehima was a part of Ethiopia women's national football team that participated in the 2016 CECAFA Women's Championship in Uganda.

References

Year of birth missing (living people)
Living people
Place of birth missing (living people)
Ethiopian women's footballers
Women's association football forwards
Ethiopia women's international footballers